Sihu Township (Wade–Giles: Szuhu) is a rural township in Yunlin County, Taiwan.

Geography
As of February 2023, it has a population total of 21,458 and an area of 77.1189 km2, including a section of coastline on the Taiwan Strait.

History
Sihu's coastal waters were traditionally used in oyster farming, but in 1991 they were zoned for offshore industrial use.

Administrative divisions
The township comprises 21 villages: Botung, Bozi, Caicuo, Feisha, Feitung, Guanggou, Huliao, Huxi, Lincuo, Lintung, Luchang, Lunbei, Lunnan, Neihu, Sanxing, Shihu, Sihu, Xiangdiao, Xide, Xinzhuang and Xiwei.

Economy
The township produces radishes.

Notable natives
 Chen Kuei-ru, running athlete
 Kerris Tsai, pop singer
 Lee Chin-yung, Magistrate of Yunlin County (2014–2018)

References

Townships in Yunlin County